Dongchong Station is an elevated station of Line 4 of the Guangzhou Metro. It started operations on 30 December 2006. It is located at the junction of Jingzhu Expressway, Dongchong Avenue and Maofeng Road in Dongchong Town, Panyu District.

Station layout

Exits

Gallery

References

Railway stations in China opened in 2006
Guangzhou Metro stations in Nansha District